Pollex archi is a moth of the family Erebidae first described by Michael Fibiger in 2007. It is known from the Kangean Islands of Indonesia.

The wingspan is about 12 mm. The forewing is narrow and blackish brown, although the medial area is lighter brown. The hindwing is unicolorous grey brown with an indistinct black discal spot and the underside unicolorous grey brown.

References

Micronoctuini
Moths described in 2007